Bhagauna is a village in West Champaran district in the Indian state of Bihar.

Demographics
 India census, Bhagauna had a population of 2118 in 367 households. Males constitute 51.84% of the population and females 48.15%. Bhagauna has an average literacy rate of 50.75%, lower than the national average of 74%: male literacy is 62.51%, and female literacy is 37.48%. In Bhagauna, 22.6% of the population is under 6 years of age.

References

Villages in West Champaran district